The 2022–23 American International Yellow Jackets men's ice hockey season was the 75th season of play for the program and 20th in the Atlantic Hockey conference. The Yellow Jackets represented American International College, played their home games at MassMutual Center and were coached by Eric Lang, in his 7th season.

Season
Coming into the season as the three-time reigning Atlantic Hockey champion, AIC's biggest hurdle for a title was the monumental turnover with the roster. With more than half of the team leaving, coach Lang brought in a mix of freshman and transfers to try and plug the holes in the lineup. While the brain trust in goal had left, the Yellow Jackets managed to retain Blake Bennett, the team's leading scorer from the previous year. Even with the reshuffling on the defensive side, AIC posted nearly identical number, allowing 2.45 goals per game. Senior Jarrett Fiske ended up with the lion's share of minutes while transfer Alexandros Aslanidis proved to be a capable backup. The retooled offense was nearly as strong, scoring slightly fewer goals per game. Unfortunately, AIC's overall performance wasn't quite up to the championship standards.

The team got off to a decent start, posting winning records both in and outside their conference. November, however, was not kind to the Yellow Jackets and the team lost four conference matches. From that point on, the Yellow Jackets were playing catchup with RIT. AIC played well for the rest of the regular season, not losing consecutive games for the remainder of the regular season, but they could never match the Tigers and ended up 2nd in the league standings.

Because of the team's poor non-conference results, AIC finished well below the cutoff line for an at-large bid and would have to win the conference tournament to return to the NCAA tournament. The Yellow Jackets opened against Holy Cross and won the first game comfortably. After that the team appear to lose all of its momentum and were outplayed by the Crusaders. AIC was outshot 44–91 in the following two games but the disparity in talent allowed the matches to remain close. After a narrow defeat in the second game, AIC got into a dogfight with Holy Cross in the deciding game. The Yellow Jackets fell behind on three separate occasions but were able to tie the game each time and force the game into overtime. While the play was a little more even in the extra session, the team was unable to stop the Crusaders from netting the winning goal and ending the season for the Yellow Jackets.

Departures

Recruiting

Roster
As of September 15, 2022.

|}

Standings

Schedule and results

|-
!colspan=12 style=";" | Regular Season

|-
!colspan=12 style=";" |

Scoring statistics

Goaltending statistics

Rankings

Note: USCHO did not release a poll in weeks 1, 13, or 26.

References

2022–23
2022–23 Atlantic Hockey men's ice hockey season
2022–23 NCAA Division I men's ice hockey by team
2023 in sports in Massachusetts
2022 in sports in Massachusetts